Rémi Marcel Adiko (born 15 January 1982) is an Ivorian footballer who plays for Al-Muharraq in the Bahraini Premier League.

Career
Adiko played for Egyptian Premier League side Zamalek, but struggled to make regular appearances with the first team. The club canceled his contract in the summer of 2010, and following his release, Adiko signed for Libyan Premier League club Alakhdhar.

Adiko helped Sudan Premier League side Al-Merreikh reach the semi-finals of the 2012 CAF Confederation Cup.

References

External links
 

1982 births
Living people
Ivorian footballers
Association football midfielders
Ivorian expatriate sportspeople in Morocco
Expatriate footballers in Algeria
Africa Sports d'Abidjan players
Ivorian expatriate sportspeople in Algeria
ES Sétif players
Expatriate footballers in Morocco
Ivorian expatriate sportspeople in Egypt
Ivorian expatriate sportspeople in the Republic of the Congo
Expatriate footballers in the Republic of the Congo
Moghreb Tétouan players
Expatriate footballers in Egypt
JC d'Abidjan players
Al-Muharraq SC players
Ivorian expatriate sportspeople in Sudan
Ivorian expatriate sportspeople in Bahrain
Expatriate footballers in Sudan
Expatriate footballers in Bahrain
Al-Merrikh SC players
Footballers from Abidjan